Discoverer 36, also known as Corona 9029, was an American optical reconnaissance satellite which was launched in 1961. It was a KH-3 Corona satellite, based on an Agena-B rocket. It was the penultimate KH-3 satellite to be launched, the last successful mission, and the most successful of the program.

The launch of Discoverer 36 occurred at 20:40 UTC on 12 December 1961. A Thor DM-21 Agena-B rocket was used, flying from Launch Complex 75-3-4 at the Vandenberg Air Force Base. Upon successfully reaching orbit, it was assigned the Harvard designation 1961 Alpha Kappa 1. OSCAR 1, the first amateur radio satellite, was launched aboard the same rocket.

Images were recorded onto  film, and returned in a Satellite Recovery Vehicle four days after launch. The Satellite Recovery Vehicle used by Discoverer 36 was SRV-525. Once its images had been returned, Discoverer 36 remained in orbit until it decayed on 8 March 1962.

References

Spacecraft launched in 1961
Spacecraft which reentered in 1962